Italy is a European country. 

Italy may also refer to:

 Italy (geographical region)
 Italian Peninsula
 Roman Italy
 Kingdom of Italy (Holy Roman Empire), a constituent kingdom of the Holy Roman Empire
 Italian Republic (Napoleonic), a French client state in northern Italy 1802–1805
 Kingdom of Italy (Napoleonic), a French client state 1805–1814
 Kingdom of Italy, an independent and unified Italian state 1861–1946
 Imperial Italy (fascist), an ambitious project envisioned by Fascist Italy
 Italy, New York, USA, a town
 Italy, Texas, USA, a town
 "Italy" (Everybody Loves Raymond), a television episode
 "Italy", a poem by Patti Smith from her 1978 book Babel (book)
 I.T.A.L.Y., a 2008 Filipino film
 A main character from the anime Hetalia: Axis Powers.

See also
 Air Italy (disambiguation)
 Little Italy (disambiguation)
 Italia (disambiguation)
 Italian (disambiguation)
 Kingdom of Italy (disambiguation)
 Imperial Italy (disambiguation)
 Fascist Italy (disambiguation)
 Italian people (disambiguation)